Pitfall is a 1948 American film noir crime film directed by André de Toth. The film is based on the novel The Pitfall by Jay Dratler and stars Dick Powell, Lizabeth Scott, and Jane Wyatt, and features Raymond Burr.

Plot

John "Johnny" Forbes (Dick Powell) is a middle-class husband and father who is tired of his boring routine, working for the Olympic Mutual Insurance Company in downtown Los Angeles. On a day when he is especially downhearted about his life, private investigator and former policeman J.B. "Mac" MacDonald (Raymond Burr) reports to him regarding an embezzler who had been bonded by Olympic Mutual.  The man, Bill Smiley (Byron Barr), is serving time for the crime, and is eligible for parole in two months. Smiley had given several expensive gifts – including a speedboat named Tempest - to his girlfriend, Santa Monica model Mona Stevens (Lizabeth Scott).

Mac admits he is attracted to Mona and, wanting to remain on the case, offers to go speak to her about retrieving the illicit gifts. Forbes tells the investigator his job is done and that he will go himself. At her apartment, the sultry blonde cooperates, especially after she learns that Smiley's parole may be sped up if she does, but needles Forbes about his job. He suggests they go for a drink. They go out on the speedboat, taking turns driving it; Forbes notices how much she loves the boat. After the drinks, Mona suggests dinner. The two begin a physical relationship.  Mac, who is parked outside her apartment, sees Forbes leave much later that night.

The next day, Mac is waiting for Forbes in his office. He says he has noticed the list of items reclaimed from Mona, but that the boat is not there; Forbes denies knowledge of it. Mac reveals he possesses the bill of sale. He reiterates how much he likes Mona and asks Forbes what it was he found to spend so much time talking with her about.  Forbes is taken aback and decides to allow the boat to be re-possessed. When he tells Mona about this, that Mac knew he had let her keep it and could cause trouble, she reveals that Mac had been pounding on her door the previous night "until all hours".

When Forbes arrives home, Mac is there and proceeds to beat him up, saying, "I told you I like that girl" and "Maybe this will keep you home where you belong for a few days".

A happy Mona awakes the next morning and finds that Forbes has left his briefcase in her apartment. From her job at May Company department store she telephones his office and learns that he has called in sick. She borrows a co-worker's car, having decided to go to Forbes' home to visit him and take him some food; she gets his address from a card in the briefcase. She arrives at the moment when the doctor, Forbes' wife Sue (Jane Wyatt), and their son Tommy (Jimmy Hunt) are all outside. She overhears their conversation and realizes her lover's marital status. When he recovers, Forbes meets Mona and she breaks off the affair, not wanting to destroy his family.

Forbes rededicates himself to his wife, son and career, feeling a new contentment. Meanwhile, Mac continues to stalk Mona, both at her job and at home; she tells him bluntly that she does not like him, but he is not deterred. She contacts Forbes to tell him that when she threatened to call police, Mac in turn threatened to tell Sue about the affair. Forbes goes to Mac's apartment and repays him for the beating, promising to kill him if he ever talks about his family again. Mac visits Smiley in prison and drops broad hints that Mona has been fooling around with the insurance adjuster. Shortly, Mona learns that her cooperation had an effect and that Smiley is getting out of jail imminently. She visits him the day before and he angrily asks about both Mac and Forbes; he sees that she is not wearing the engagement ring he had given her with the stolen funds.

Mona tells Forbes how Mac has been visiting Smiley and provoking him. At home, Sue, who has not believed the story that her husband told her about being beaten up by muggers, probes him to tell her what is on his mind.  As he is about to do so, their son has a nightmare; the subject is dropped.

When Smiley is freed, Mona finds him in her apartment drinking. He has a gun given to him by Mac, and wants to know from her why Mac wants him to kill Forbes. Mona admits the affair but begs him to understand it is over.  He says he can forgive her, but not Forbes, and leaves. Mona telephones Forbes to warn him; Forbes tries to get Sue and Tommy to leave but fails. He tells Sue that a man from the office is coming to talk to him.  He waits in the dark for Smiley, with his own gun; when the man arrives, Forbes manages to sneak up and order him to leave, but Smiley does not and breaks a window to enter the house. Forbes shoots him dead.

Thinking that both his rivals are taken care of, Mac shows up at Mona's, fully expecting her to go away with him.  She shoots him.

Forbes allows the police to think that he has killed a prowler, and after they are gone, he finally confesses everything to Sue. Over her objections, and after walking the streets all night, he also tells all to the District Attorney (John Litel). The DA reluctantly pronounces that Johnny is safe because it was justifiable homicide; his story matches up with Mona's, who is now in custody. The charge against her will depend on whether Mac lives or dies.

Outside, Sue is waiting for Forbes. She says she will give him a second chance, though she is not sure their marriage will ever be the same.

Cast
 Dick Powell as John Forbes
 Lizabeth Scott as Mona Stevens
 Jane Wyatt as Sue Forbes
 Raymond Burr as MacDonald
 John Litel as District Attorney
 Byron Barr as Bill Smiley
 Jimmy Hunt as Tommy Forbes
 Ann Doran as Maggie
 Selmer Jackson as Ed Brawley
 Margaret Wells as Terry
 Dick Wessel as Desk Sergeant

Hays Code infraction

According to Madeleine Stowe, guest host on the May 21, 2016, Turner Classic Movies screening of the film, the production was in trouble because the script violated the Hays Code, as the adulterer was insufficiently punished. When director DeToth found out, he met with two senior Hays Code members, whom he had selected with care. DeToth revealed that he knew the two were both married and both had mistresses. There were no problems after that.

Reception
Film critic Fernando F. Croce wrote about the screenplay and direction,The title's abyss, pitilessly moral, sprawls horizontally rather than vertically, a lateral track following disheveled Dick Powell bottoming out, wandering the streets after confessing murder and adultery to wife Jane Wyatt. Fate may be at play, yet André de Toth's grip is less determinist than humanist, airtight but wounded, each pawn in the grid allowed trenchant space to deepen the fallout of their own actions.

Film critic Dennis Schwartz wrote of the film,Powell is the archetypal average American man living out the American Dream in the suburbs, where his type is viewed as the backbone of the country. This film does a good job of poking holes at that dream, showing underneath the surface all is not well.

A one-time police officer  sued the producers for libel claiming the film was based on him.

Dreams
The film depicts this scene from Karl Kamb's screenplay: When Tommy is awakened by a nightmare, he asks, "Daddy, what makes a dream?" Forbes comforts his son with the following words:

Home media
Pitfall was released on Blu-ray and DVD by Kino Lorber Studio Classics in November 2015.

References

External links
 
 
 
 
 ''Pitfall' film trailer at YouTube

1948 films
1948 crime drama films
Adultery in films
American crime drama films
American black-and-white films
Film noir
Films based on American novels
Films directed by Andre DeToth
Films produced by Samuel Bischoff
Films set in Los Angeles
United Artists films
1940s English-language films
1940s American films